Mary Turner (born April 1958) is a business executive who has been CEO of Koovs since October 2015.

Early life 
Born in Malaysia, she graduated from the University of Birmingham with a BSc in Management in 1982 and subsequently completed an MBA at the University of Warwick. She married Martin Turner in 1990, and has one son Samuel Turner.

Career 
In 2001, Turner became managing director of LineOne. Tiscali purchased LineOne in 2001 and Turner became chief executive of Tiscali UK in 2003. Turner was named CEO of AlertMe in March 2010. From September 2009 to December 2013, she served as a Non-Executive Director of ASOS.com. In July 2015, Turner was appointed CEO of Koovs.

References

1958 births
Living people
Alumni of the University of Birmingham
Alumni of the University of Warwick
21st-century British businesspeople
21st-century British businesswomen